An enhancer trap is a method in molecular biology. The enhancer trap construct contains a transposable element and a reporter gene. The first is necessary for (random) insertion in the genome, the latter is necessary for identification of the spatial regulation by the enhancer. On top of this, the construct usually includes a genetic marker, e.g., the white gene producing red-colored eyes in Drosophila, or ampicillin resistance in E. coli.

The most common and basic enhancer traps are: P[lacZ] from the bacterium E. coli and P[GAL4] from yeast. There exists a large number of fly stocks containing GAL4 insertions and an equally large number of fly stocks containing an UAS DNA sequence followed by a gene of interest, which permits the expression of a large number of genes with different GAL4 "drivers".  Rather than generating transgenic flies with the enhancer linked directly to the gene of interest (which takes about a year when starting without the appropriate DNA construct), one transgenic fly is simply mated (crossed) with another transgenic fly.

See also
Gene trapping
P element

References

Genetics